Buckinghamshire Railway Centre is a railway museum operated by the Quainton Railway Society Ltd. at Quainton Road railway station, about  west of Aylesbury in Buckinghamshire, England. The site is divided into two halves which are joined by two foot-bridges, one of which provides wheelchair access. Each side has a demonstration line with various workshop buildings as well as museum buildings.

History

In 1962, the London Railway Preservation Society was formed. It bought a series of former London Underground vehicles and collectables, and holds the largest collection of London and North Western Railway memorabilia. These were held at various sites around London, mainly two government depots at Luton and Bishop's Stortford, making both access, restoration and preservation difficult.

On 24 April 1971 the society absorbed the London Railway Preservation Society, taking custody of its collection of historic railway equipment.

Restoration
The station was maintained in working order, used as a bookshop and ticket office. The extensive sidings were still intact, and although disconnected from the mainline in 1967, were used for locomotive restoration work. The Society eventually restored the main station building to its 1900 appearance, renaming the site the Buckinghamshire Railway Centre. A smaller building on the former Brill platform, once a shelter for passengers waiting for Brill and down trains, was used first as a store then as a shop for a number of years before its current use to house an exhibit on the history of the Brill Tramway. A former London Transport building from Wembley Park was dismantled and re-erected at Quainton Road to serve as a maintenance shed.

Mainline services
 
Although the BRC's trains are run on the former station sidings, the station still has a working Network Rail line passing through it. This connects  with the Bletchley to Oxford cross-country route at Claydon (LNE) Junction. Regular landfill freight trains and High Speed 2 spoil trains traverse the line from waste transfer depots in Greater London as well as some from the freight terminal at Tytherington and other freight locations in the South-West of England to the former brick pits at Calvert. The High Speed 2 trains also terminate here, but are used for the construction of the new High Speed 2 depot at Calvert.

From August Bank Holiday 1971 until the 1987 season, and again from August Bank Holiday 2001 the station has had special passenger trains from Aylesbury in connection with events at the Centre - these shuttles now run regularly each Spring and August Bank Holiday weekend.

Present
With an extensively redeveloped site on both sides of the working mainline, BRC houses around 170 items of locomotives and rolling stock, in buildings dating from 1874 to the 1960s. The adjacent World War II warehouses of the Ministry of Food Buffer Depot in the former downside yard have been taken over to display many items awaiting restoration, whilst the Society have added a members' reference library.

Rewley Road

Rewley Road, the Oxford terminus of Harry Verney's Buckinghamshire Railway and of the Oxford to Cambridge Line, closed to passengers on 1 October 1951 with trains diverted to the former GWR Oxford General, the current Oxford station. In co-operation with the Science Museum, Rewley Road was dismantled in 1999. The main station building and part of the platform canopy were then moved to BRC and re-erected in 2002 at the north-west corner of the site, now providing improved visitor facilities and the main offices of the QRS.

Media
As one of the best-preserved period railway stations in England, Quainton Road is regularly used as a filming location for programmes such as The Jewel in the Crown, the Doctor Who serial Black Orchid, Midsomer Murders and Taskmaster.

Future developments

High Speed 2's planned route passes immediately to the west of the site, not impacting the centre directly, although it will preclude any restoration of the Brill Tramway.

Collection
The collection includes locomotives, carriages, and assorted rolling stock, plus a large amount of memorabilia and documents.

Locomotives

Diesel multiple units
 BR Class 115 unit 51886+59761+51889 "Aylesbury College Silver Jubilee 1987"

Electric multiple units

 Post Office Railway (London) 1930 Stock No. 803 
 London Underground CO/CP Stock unit 53028+013063+54233 
 New York City Subway car No. 1144, an R6, converted into a cafeteria for the museum.

Carriages and vans
 BR Mk 1 TPO sorting van no. 80394
 London Transport brake vans nos. B557 and FB578

Carriages

Passenger coaching stock

Non-passenger coaching stock

Wagons

Cranes

References

Bibliography

External links

Buckinghamshire Railway Centre website.
Buckinghamshire Railway Centre Stockbook

Heritage railways in Buckinghamshire
Museums in Buckinghamshire
Railway museums in England